The knockout stage of the 2017 Campeonato Paulista will begin on 1 April with the quarter-final and will be concluded on 7 May 2017 with the final. A total of eight teams will compete in the knockout stage.

Round and draw dates
All draws held at Federação Paulista de Futebol headquarters in São Paulo, Brazil.

Format
Each tie is played over two legs, with the team with the best placing in the general table playing the second leg at home. The quarterfinals are played between the winners and runners-up of each group. In the semifinals the best team (first) will face the team with the worst campaign (fourth), while the second will face the team with the third best campaign.

Qualified teams

Bracket

Quarterfinals

|}

Quarterfinal A

Quarterfinal B

Quarterfinal C

Quarterfinal D

Semifinals

|}

Semifinal 1

Semifinal 2

Finals

|}

References

Campeonato Paulista seasons